The women's 800 metres at the 2009 World Championships in Athletics was held at the Olympic Stadium on 16, 17 and 19 August. Prior to the championships, there was no clear favourite for the race – the twenty fastest times of the season had been run by seventeen different athletes. The reigning World and Olympic champions, Janeth Jepkosgei and Pamela Jelimo, had not shown the dominance of previous seasons. The two fastest runners of the season, Caster Semenya and Maggie Vessey, had recently set personal bests but lacked any major championships experience, while third best Anna Alminova was a 1500 metres specialist. European Indoor Champion Mariya Savinova and Svetlana Klyuka, fourth at the Olympics, were other strong competitors. The 2007 World medallists Hasna Benhassi and Mayte Martínez, and Olympic finalist Yuliya Krevsun were also predicted as medal possibilities.

The events in the heats resulted in a surprise decision: world-leader Semenya accidentally tripped Jepkosgei and the defending champion finished last in the first heat. The Kenyan athletics federation appealed the decision and she was reinstated to run in the second semi-final, and Semenya was not disqualified as her actions were deemed unintentional. Yuliya Krevsun, Elisa Cusma Piccione, and Zulia Calatayud were the fastest of the heat winners on the first day of competition. With only eight places on offer, there were a number of high-profile scalps in the semi-finals. The first race saw past medallists Calatayud and Benhassi fail to qualify, Svetlana Klyuka was fifth in the second heat, while Vessey and Jelimo dropped out in the third semi-final of the day. Caster Semenya was the fastest in the preliminaries with 1:58.66.

In the final, Semenya lead the race from the halfway mark, and continued to increase her lead from that point onwards, winning her first World Championship gold medal in a time of one minute and 55.45 seconds. Krevsun was in second place near the end of final straight, but she faded a little and allowed Jepkosgei and Jenny Meadows to challenge her position. With just a tenth of a second between second and fourth, Krevsun fell behind the Kenyan and British athletes, who ended up with the silver and bronze medals.

Semenya's victory was one of the focal points of the championship, not just because of her achievement on the track at such a young age, but also because of the events that followed. Having beaten her previous 800 m best by four seconds at the African Junior Championships just a month earlier, her quick improvements came under scrutiny. The combination of her rapid athletic progression and her appearance culminated in the IAAF asking her to take a gender test to ascertain whether she was female. A number of South African governing bodies came to the defence of Semenya, saying the athlete had been treated unfairly, and world record holder Michael Johnson was highly critical of the way that the sensitive issue had been dealt with publicly.

Medalists

Records

Qualification standards

Schedule

Results

Heats
Qualification: First 3 in each heat(Q) and the next 6 fastest(q) advance to the semi-finals.

Key:  NR = National record, Q = qualification by place in heat, q = qualification by overall place, SB = Seasonal best

Semi-finals
Janeth Jepkosgei was tripped in the first round heats, and after protest by the Kenyan Federation, was added to the semi-finals; she will run in lane 7 of heat 2 along with Hazel Clark. The ruling was that the trip was accidental, by Caster Semenya, who was therefore not disqualified.

Qualification: First 2 in each semifinals(Q) and the next 2 fastest(q) advance to the final.

Final

Key:  PB = Personal best, SB = Seasonal best, WL = World leading (in a given season)

References

External links
800 metres results (Archived 2009-09-08). IAAF. Retrieved on 2009-08-16.

800 metres
800 metres at the World Athletics Championships
2009 in women's athletics